Den Monastery  is a small Buddhist monastery in Ganzi, Sichuan, China.

References

Buddhist monasteries in Sichuan
Tibetan Buddhist monasteries